The Children's Wish Foundation of Canada is a registered national Canadian charitable organization whose mission is to fulfill the wishes of children diagnosed with life-threatening illnesses. Founded in 1983, the foundation has chapters in every province and territory of Canada. As of 2017 has granted over 25,000 wishes. The most popular wishes include travel and the opportunity to meet celebrities.
Its mascot is named "Roary".

History
In 1984, the organization began at the kitchen table of volunteer Laura Cole. Originally granting fewer than 20 wishes a year, the foundation has established the capacity to fulfill upwards of 1,000 wishes annually. They help children all across Canada.

References

External links
Official website

Children's charities based in Canada